Mesostena  is a genus of darkling beetles in the subfamily Pimeliinae.

Selected species
 Mesostena angustata
 Mesostena gracilis
 Mesostena longicollis
 Mesostena longicornis
 Mesostena picea
 Mesostena puncticollis

References

Pimeliinae
Tenebrionidae genera